Mount Cecily is a prominent peak,  high, standing  northwest of Mount Raymond, in the Grosvenor Mountains. It was discovered by the British Antarctic Expedition, 1907–09, and named for Shackleton's daughter. The position agrees with that shown on Shackleton's map but the peak does not lie in the Dominion Range as he thought, being separated from that range by the Mill Glacier.

References 

Mountains of the Ross Dependency
Dufek Coast